Oana Lungescu (born 29 June 1958) is a Romanian journalist, with philological education (English and Spanish). Since 2010, she has been spokesperson of NATO.

Born in Bucharest, she graduated in 1981 from the Faculty of Philology of the University of Bucharest, the English-Spanish section. Between 1981 and 1983 she worked as an English teacher at Buşteni. In 1983 she refused to cooperate with the Securitate. The Securitate prepared an informational tracking file of Lungescu and gave her the Lorena code.

Her mother, originally from Cluj, had settled in 1981 as a doctor in the town of Viersen, North Rhine-Westphalia. Oana Lungescu requested in 1983 the granting of a passport for visiting the mother, a request refused by the Romanian authorities. Securitate tried to force her collaboration through blackmail with a passport and medication for her father, a lawyer, who was seriously ill. After her father died in 1985, she was allowed to live in the Federal Republic of Germany, where she obtained German citizenship.

Between 1985 and 1992, she worked as a reporter for the Romanian section of the BBC. Until 1996, she moved to the post of editor and auxiliar of the Romanian section of the BBC, with the editorial name "Ana Maria Bota". In 1997, she moved to the BBC World Service, where she worked as a correspondent in Brussels and Berlin until 2010, when NATO Secretary General Anders Fogh Rasmussen named her as the new spokeswoman, succeeding James Appathurai.

External links
@NATOpress Oana Lungescu Twitter account
BBC în limba română, 1939-2008, interview on 30 August 2011
Oana Lungescu, În România, de Paști
Oana Lungescu, Euro election gets celebrity veneer
 "Cel mai tanar informator al Securitatii avea 10 ani"

Notes 

1958 births
Living people
Journalists from Bucharest
NATO officials
Romanian journalists
Romanian women journalists
BBC newsreaders and journalists
University of Bucharest alumni
Teachers of English as a second or foreign language
British women television journalists
British radio presenters
British women radio presenters
Romanian radio presenters
Romanian women radio presenters